Milogorskaya is a rural locality (a village) in Markushevskoye Rural Settlement, Tarnogsky District, Vologda Oblast, Russia. The population was 16 as of 2002.

Geography 
Milogorskaya is located 23 km southeast of Tarnogsky Gorodok (the district's administrative centre) by road. Kuznetsovskaya is the nearest rural locality.

References 

Rural localities in Tarnogsky District